Shirley A. McAlary is a Canadian politician, who served as the mayor of Saint John, New Brunswick from 1995 to 2004. She was defeated by Norm McFarlane in the 2004 municipal election.

McAlary subsequently ran for a councillor-at-large seat in the 2012 municipal election, and was successfully reelected to Saint John City Council.

In the May 9, 2016 election McAlary became deputy mayor of Saint John.

References

Mayors of Saint John, New Brunswick
Women mayors of places in New Brunswick
Living people
Year of birth missing (living people)
Saint John, New Brunswick city councillors